Blakea glandulosa is a species of plant in the family Melastomataceae. It is endemic to Ecuador.  Its natural habitats are subtropical or tropical moist lowland forests and subtropical or tropical moist montane forests.

References

Endemic flora of Ecuador
glandulosa
Near threatened plants
Taxonomy articles created by Polbot